With Love, Delhi! is an English-language Indian film directed by Nikhil Singh and starring Ashish Lal, Pariva Pranati, Tom Alter, Seema Biswas, and Kiran Kumar. It was dubbed in Hindi by the actors.

Plot
Khanna (Kiran Kumar), the biggest real estate developer in Delhi, is kidnapped by Ajay (Tom Alter), who claims to be a historian. To rescue Khanna, his daughter Priyanka (Pariva Pranati) has to solve cryptic historical clues pointing to monuments of Delhi. Her best friend and a history graduate, Ashish, joins her in this difficult mission.

Cast
 Ashish Lal ... Ashish
 Pariva Pranati ... Priyanka Khanna
 Tom Alter ... Ajay
 Kiran Kumar ... Khanna
 Seema Biswas ... Mom of Ashish

Sound track
The music is composed by Sanjoy Chowdhury. The film has two Hindi songs and both are directed by Ashutosh Matela. The choreographers are Amit Verlani and Gaurav Ahlawat. The singers are Shaan, Sarika and Suraj Jagan. The lyricist is Amitabh Verma.

References

External links
 

2010s Hindi-language films
2011 films
Films set in Delhi
2010s English-language films